Kew Gardens is a botanical garden in London, England, managed by the Royal Botanic Gardens, Kew.

Kew Gardens may also refer to:

Places
Kew Gardens (Toronto) in the Beaches neighbourhood of Toronto, Ontario, Canada
Kew Gardens, Queens, the name of a neighborhood in the borough of Queens in New York City, USA
Kew Gardens, Southport, a former public park in the Kew suburb of Southport, England

Art, entertainment, and media
"Kew Gardens" (short story), a short story by Virginia Woolf

Transport
Kew Gardens (LIRR station), a Long Island Railroad station
Kew Gardens station (London) in zones 3 & 4 of the London Underground in England
Kew Gardens railway station (Merseyside), a former station in Southport, England
Kew Gardens Interchange, a road interchange in Queens, New York
Kew Gardens–Union Turnpike (IND Queens Boulevard Line), a New York City Subway station on the IND Queens Boulevard Line

Other
Kew Gardens (horse), Thoroughbred racehorse, winner of the 2018 St Leger